Larry William Playfair (born June 23, 1958) is a Canadian former professional ice hockey player. Playfair had a reputation as being a hard-working, pugnacious defender. He played for the Buffalo Sabres and Los Angeles Kings in the NHL and he has worked as a color analyst for Sabres television broadcasts since his 1990 retirement due to chronic back problems. His younger brother Jim Playfair shares a lot of the same characteristics - both were drafted in the first round of the NHL Entry Draft (Larry in 1978 and Jim in 1982), and both played junior hockey for the Portland Winter Hawks of the Western Hockey League. However, Larry played 688 career NHL games; Jim a mere 21.

Playfair currently lives on Grand Island, New York. He was president of the Sabres Alumni Association spanning at least December 2007 and March 2012.

Career statistics

Regular season and playoffs

Awards
 WCHL First All-Star Team – 1978

See also 
Notable families in the NHL

References

External links
 

1958 births
Living people
Buffalo Sabres draft picks
Buffalo Sabres players
Ice hockey people from British Columbia
Los Angeles Kings players
National Hockey League first-round draft picks
Portland Winterhawks players
Buffalo Sabres announcers
People from the Regional District of Bulkley-Nechako
People from Grand Island, New York
Canadian ice hockey defencemen